Amanecer may refer to:

Music 
 Amanecer (Joey Calderazzo album), 2007
 Amanecer (Bomba Estéreo album), 2015
 "Amanecer" (song), 2015, performed by Spanish singer Edurne

 "Amanecer", a 1978 song by Armando Manzanero
 "Amanecer", a 1982 song by Tish Hinojosa

Other uses
 Amanecer (film), a 2009 short film by Alvaro D. Ruiz
 CP Amanecer, a Spanish football team

See also
 Amanecer de un sueño (Awaking from a Dream), a 2008 Spanish film
 Rojo Amanecer (Red Dawn), a 1989 Mexican film